Ian David Stevens (born 21 October 1966) is an English retired footballer. Although born in Malta, Stevens was raised in Lancaster and educated in the city at Ripley St. Thomas C of E High School.

Playing career

Preston North End and Stockport County
It was while playing local league football that Stevens was spotted by Preston North End who signed him as a professional in November 1984. His time at Deepdale was difficult however with the club going through a transitional period and at the end of the 1985–86 season he was released after playing just 12 games. After spending a month at Stockport County, Stevens found himself without a club and playing non-league football for Lancaster City.

Bolton Wanderers
It was while playing for Lancaster that struggling Bolton Wanderers came in for him in March 1987. He was predominantly a squad player at Burnden Park due to the presence of strikers John Thomas and Tony Philliskirk. In a little over four years, he made 47 appearances scoring 7 goals. After being released by Wanderers in July 1991, Stevens signed for Bury.

Bury and Shrewsbury Town
At Bury, Stevens scored 40 goals in 126 games before signing with Shrewsbury Town in August 1994 for a fee of £20k. He scored 51 goals in 132 games before moving again to Carlisle United in May 1997.

Carlisle United
Although Stevens joined Carlisle on the back of the Cumbrians' promotion, the club were relegated immediately and only preserved their football league status the following season thanks to a goal from on loan goalkeeper Jimmy Glass.

Wrexham
Stevens took a free transfer to Wrexham in July 1999. In his only season at the Racecourse Ground, he scored four goals in 20 matches. He also played a game on loan at Cheltenham Town without scoring.

Carlisle United
Stevens' release from Wrexham in August 2000 paved the way for a return to Carlisle. However, in June 2002 he went for one last hurrah with Shrewsbury Town. In his one season at Gay Meadow he scored just two goals in 24 games before leaving in August 2003.

Gretna, non-league & back to Lancaster
Stevens first signed for Barrow but after a month he left and signed for Scottish Football League club Gretna. Despite getting sent off on his debut for Gretna, Stevens settled in well and in two seasons at Gretna he played 26+5 matches scoring 13 goals and was a member of the championship winning squad of 2004–05. From Gretna, Stevens moved again into non-league football with Fleetwood Town, winning promotion to the Northern Premier League in 2005–06. After a break he signed for his home town club Lancaster City for the start of 2007–08, but played just a handful more games for his home town club before leaving at the end of September 2007 and then signing for Bacup Borough. As a professional Stevens played 572 first team games and scored 175 goals.

References

External links

1966 births
Living people
English footballers
Maltese footballers
Preston North End F.C. players
Stockport County F.C. players
Bolton Wanderers F.C. players
Bury F.C. players
Shrewsbury Town F.C. players
Carlisle United F.C. players
Wrexham A.F.C. players
Fleetwood Town F.C. players
Cheltenham Town F.C. players
Gretna F.C. players
Barrow A.F.C. players
Lancaster City F.C. players
Bacup Borough F.C. players
People from Valletta
Association football forwards